The Aciculidae are a family of minute land snails which have opercula (an operculum is a little door that closes the shell when the animal retracts into it). In other words, Aciculidae are terrestrial operculate gastropods. 
Even though Aciculidae are land snails, they live in rather wet conditions, among mosses and dead leaves and they have sometimes been described as "winkles come ashore".

Taxonomy
Previously this family was placed in the infraorder Littorinimorpha, in the suborder Hypsogastropoda in the order Sorbeoconcha in the taxonomy of the Gastropoda by Ponder & Lindberg (1997).

The family Aciculidae is in the informal group Architaenioglossa, belonging to the clade Caenogastropoda, (according to the taxonomy of the Gastropoda by Bouchet & Rocroi, 2005). This family has no subfamilies according to the taxonomy of the Gastropoda by Bouchet & Rocroi, 2005.

In the Taxonomy of the Gastropoda (Bouchet et al., 2017), it was placed under Cyclophoroidea.

Genera
Genera within the family Aciculidae include:
 Acicula W. Hartmann, 1821 - the needle snail, type genus
 Menkia Boeters, E. Gittenberger & Subai, 1985
 Platyla Moquin-Tandon, 1856
 Renea Nevill, 1880
 Cretatortulosa gignens 2020

References

 Horst Janus, 1965. The Young Specialist Looks at Land and Freshwater Molluscs, Burke, London
 Egorov, R. V., 2009, Kladovaja rakovin Rossii [Treasure of Russian shells]. Supplement 3. A review of the genera of the recent terrestrial pectinibranch molluscs (synopsis mainly based on published data). Part II, Littoriniformes. Hainesiidae, Aciculidae, Cyclophoridae, Craspedopomatidae. Moscow. 58 pp

 
Gastropod families
Taxa named by John Edward Gray